Florida State Road 9 (SR 9) is a state road in the U.S. state of Florida. While SR 9 is mainly used as a state designation for Interstate 95 in Florida from the Golden Glades Interchange in Miami Gardens to the Georgia border (near Yulee, Florida), a signed SR 9, which is locally known in the Miami area as West 27th Avenue, Unity Boulevard, and historically Grapeland Boulevard, extends  from the Coconut Grove section of Miami to the Golden Glades Interchange (where the unsigned portion continues northward along I-95). The segment of I-95 south of the Golden Glades Interchange carries the designation of State Road 9A.

Route description
Southwest 27th Avenue begins locally at Bayshore Drive in the Coconut Grove neighborhood in Miami. The road heads north  until it intersects Dixie Highway (US 1). SR 9 begins at this intersection, located between the Coral Way and Coconut Grove neighborhoods. SR 9 then makes its way north, cutting through all three sub-neighborhoods of Coral Way—Silver Bluff, Coral Gate, and Shenandoah—with a major intersection with Coral Way (SR 972) in the middle of it. After passing through Coral Way, SR 9's next major intersection is with the Tamiami Trail (US 41 / SR 90) before passing through more residential areas. The next major intersection with Flagler Street is located only a block west from the historic Miami Senior High School, as well as a half block east from the Miami-Dade County Auditorium. SR 9 continues north for a mile before its interchange with the Dolphin Expressway (SR 836). Five blocks north of the Dolphin Expressway, SR 9 crosses the Miami River into the Allapattah neighborhood. There are two major intersections in Allapatah: the first is with Northwest 36th Street (US 27 / SR 25), and the second is with the Airport Expressway (SR 112). Afterwards, SR 9 leaves Miami city limits and bisects the CDP of Brownsville. While in Brownsville, Miami's Metrorail splits the street in two, with two lanes running in either direction on both sides of the track.

After its intersection with Northwest 79th Street (SR 934), SR 9 enters the CDPs of West Little River and Westview. In Westview, its intersection with Gratigny Road (SR 924) forms the east border and northeast corner of Miami-Dade College's North Campus, and is also a quarter mile west from the former Westview Country Club.

As it enters the city of Opa-locka, SR 9 intersects with Northwest 135th Street (SR 916) before turning to the northeast. Here, Northwest 27th Avenue continues northward as State Road 817. The signed portion of SR 9 ends at the Golden Glades Interchange  later; however, SR 9 continues northward as a designation of Interstate 95 to the Georgia state line.

History
The section of SR 9 northeast into the Golden Glades Interchange was planned before the Interstate Highway System as a bypass to US 1. The bypass route was built next to CSX's Miami Subdivision.

Major intersections

Related routes

State Road 9A (Jacksonville)

State Road 9A (SR 9A) is a state road in Jacksonville, Florida. It is the FDOT designation of Interstate 295. The freeway, divided into the East Beltway and the West Beltway, circles the Jacksonville metropolitan area.

State Road 9A (Miami)

State Road 9A (SR 9A) is a state road in Miami-Dade County. It is the FDOT designation of Interstate 95 from its junction with SR 9 in North Miami Beach to the freeway's southern terminus at US 1.

State Road 9B

State Road 9B is a freeway that runs between Duval County and St. Johns County. It connects the southeastern corner of Interstate 295 with CR 2209 in St. Johns County, crossing over I-95 and US 1 in the process. The freeway from I-95 to I-295 is expected to be signed as Interstate 795.

References

External links

009
009
009
009
009
009
009
009
009
009
009
009
009
009
009
1946 establishments in Florida